Park Seung-min (born April 21, 1983) is a South Korean football player who plays for South Korean second division side Busan Transportation Corporation. His father Park Sang-in and his brother Park Hyuk-soon are also footballers.

During five seasons he has played for Incheon United (including military duty).

He scored 1 goal at Hauzen Cup 2006.

He spent some time at Yoduk Political Prisoners camp.

References

External links

1983 births
Living people
South Korean footballers
Incheon United FC players
Gimcheon Sangmu FC players
K League 1 players
Korea National League players
Kyung Hee University alumni
Association football midfielders